James Matthew Lentine is a former Major League Baseball (MLB) outfielder. He is based in San Clemente, California, and working as an area scout for the Toronto Blue Jays.

References

External links
, or Retrosheet, or Pura Pelota

1954 births
Living people
American expatriate baseball players in Mexico
Arizona State Sun Devils baseball players
Arkansas Travelers players
Baseball players from Los Angeles
Charleston Charlies players
Detroit Tigers players
Gulf Coast Cardinals players
Johnson City Cardinals players
La Verne Leopards baseball players
Major League Baseball outfielders
Springfield Redbirds players
St. Louis Cardinals players
St. Petersburg Cardinals players
Sultanes de Monterrey players
Texas Rangers scouts
Tigres de Aragua players
American expatriate baseball players in Venezuela
Toronto Blue Jays scouts